Coromandel Watchdog is an environmental organisation lobbying in opposition to mining on the Coromandel Peninsula in New Zealand.

The Coromandel Peninsula is an area of high scenic values due to the presence of the original forest cover and a coastline that is popular for recreation. Goldmining has been carried out since the late 19th century. To the south of the peninsula the Martha Mine at Waihi is still operating.

Coromandel Watchdog began protests and lobbying in the 1970s against the activities of mining companies.  It was instrumental in having conservation land on the Coromandel Peninsula protected under Schedule 4 of the Crown Minerals Act.

In 2009, Watchdog was reactivated after a period of inactivity. The National-led Government is proposing the removal of up to 2,500 hectares of Coromandel land from Schedule 4 and Coromandel Watchdog have publicly come out and stated that they will fight the current proposals.

See also
Environment of New Zealand
Mining in New Zealand
Coromandel Gold Rush

References

External links
Coromandel Watchdog

Environmental organisations based in New Zealand
Thames-Coromandel District
Mining in New Zealand